Kicking Horse Dam is a dam in Lake County, Montana.

It impounds Dublin Gulch for irrigation and recreation. The dam is owned and operated by the Bureau of Indian Affairs, while recreation is regulated by the tribal government and the Montana Department of Fish, Wildlife and Parks.

The dam is surrounded by the territory of the Flathead Indian Reservation (known as the Tribal Trust Lands of the Confederated Salish and Kootenai Tribes), is adjacent to the town of Kicking Horse, Montana (population 80) and adjacent to the Mission Mountains Wilderness. Recreation includes fishing and bird hunting, subject to tribal regulations.

In popular culture
American poet Richard Hugo references the dam and the adjacent town in his 1973 poem "The Lady in Kicking Horse Reservoir".

References

Dams in Montana
Reservoirs in Montana
United States Bureau of Indian Affairs dams
Buildings and structures in Lake County, Montana
Dams completed in 1930
Landforms of Lake County, Montana
Native American history of Montana